The Scout and Guide movement in Tuvalu is served by:
 Girl Guides Association of Tuvalu, former member of the World Association of Girl Guides and Girl Scouts
 Tuvalu Scout Association, member of the World Organization of the Scout Movement

References

Sources 
 World Association of Girl Guides and Girl Scouts, World Bureau (2002), Trefoil Round the World. Eleventh Edition 1997.

See also